Draga pri Sinjem Vrhu is a small settlement south of Sinji Vrh in the Municipality of Črnomelj in the White Carniola area of southeastern Slovenia. The area is part of the traditional region of Lower Carniola and is now included in the Southeast Slovenia Statistical Region.

Name
The name of the settlement was changed from Draga to Draga pri Sinjem Vrhu (literally, 'Draga near Sinji Vrh') in 1955. The name Draga is derived from the Slovene common noun draga 'small, narrow valley', referring to the geographical location of the settlement.

References

External links
Draga pri Sinjem Vrhu on Geopedia

Populated places in the Municipality of Črnomelj